Results from Norwegian football in 1934. See also 1933 in Norwegian football and 1935 in Norwegian football

Class A of local association leagues
Class A of local association leagues (kretsserier) is the predecessor of a national league competition.

1In the following season, Lofoten og Vesterålen local association split into Salten and Lofoten og Vesterålen.

Norwegian Cup

Final

Northern Norwegian Cup

Final

National team

June 10: Norway – Austria 4-0, friendly

July 1: Sweden – Norway 3-3, friendly

September 2: Norway – Finland 4-2, friendly

September 23: Norway – Denmark 3-1, friendly

References

 
Seasons in Norwegian football